Mike Ames, Mikey Ames or Michael Ames may refer to:

Michael E. Ames (1822–1861), American politician from Minnesota Territory
Michael Ames (actor) (1914–1972), American film and TV performer, a/k/a Tod Andrews
Michael M. Ames (1933–2006), Canadian anthropologist
Michael Ames Viner (1944–2009), American film and record producer
Stephen Michael Ames (born 1964), Trinidadian golfer
Mikey Ames, American musical performer and improvisational artist on 2007 album Lucas
Mike Ames, American ultimate disc player for Cincinnati Revolution 2014 season

Characters 
Michael Ames, played by Barclay Hope in two seasons of 2011 American TV series, The Killing